Notylia pentachne is a species of orchid that native to Honduras, Panama, Colombia and Venezuela.

References

External links 

pentachne
Orchids of Central America
Orchids of South America
Plants described in 1854